Paulet St John, 3rd Earl of Bolingbroke (23 November 1634 – 5 October 1711), known as Paulet St John until 1688, was an English  politician who sat in the House of Commons from 1663 to 1685. He inherited the peerage as Earl of Bolingbroke in 1688.

St John was the younger son of Sir Paulet St John, younger son of Oliver St John, 1st Earl of Bolingbroke. His mother was Elizabeth Vaughan. In 1663, he was elected Member of Parliament for Bedford in a by-election to the Cavalier Parliament. He was re-elected MP for Bedford in the two elections of 1679 and in 1681. In 1688 he succeeded his elder brother in the earldom and entered the House of Lords. The following year he was appointed Custos Rotulorum of Bedfordshire, which he remained until his death. He was also a Recorder of Bedford.

Lord Bolingbroke died unmarried in October 1711, aged 76. The earldom became extinct on his death while he was succeeded in the barony of St John of Bletso by his kinsman Sir Paulet St Andrew St John, 5th Baronet.

References

1634 births
1711 deaths
People from Bedford
Paulet
English MPs 1661–1679
English MPs 1679
English MPs 1680–1681
English MPs 1681
3
Barons St John of Bletso